Two destroyers of the Imperial Japanese Navy were named Yanagi:

 , a  launched in 1917 and stricken in 1940
 , a  launched in 1944 and sunk in 1945

Imperial Japanese Navy ship names
Japanese Navy ship names